The 1936 NYU Violets football team was an American football team that represented New York University as an independent during the 1936 college football season. In their third year under head coach Mal Stevens, the team compiled a 5–3–1 record.

Schedule

References

NYU
NYU Violets football seasons
NYU Violets football
University Heights, Bronx
Sports in the Bronx